Careers New Zealand (previously Career Services) was a New Zealand Crown agent which offered advice and support to help New Zealanders make decisions about their career. This was done through face-to-face counselling, group counselling sessions, telephone support, web chat, and self-help assistance and information via a website.

On 1 July 2017, the staff and functions of Careers New Zealand were transferred to the Tertiary Education Commission.

References

External links
 Careers New Zealand

New Zealand Crown agents
Career advice services